Bob Tyler (born July 4, 1932) is a former American football coach. He coached in the high school and collegiate ranks.

A native of Water Valley, Mississippi, Tyler was a star athlete at Water Valley High School before entering military service. Following his term of duty at Ft. Bragg, North Carolina, Tyler earned his college degrees at the University of Mississippi. He began coaching in 1955 at Water Valley High and has coached football at Okolona, Senatobia, Meridian, and Corinth. His high school teams played in 119 games and achieved a record of 94–19–6.

Tyler continued his career in the collegiate ranks, as receivers coach on Johnny Vaught's Ole Miss Rebel staff. He later worked as an assistant under Bear Bryant at the University of Alabama before moving to Mississippi State as offensive coordinator.

Tyler was named head coach of the Bulldogs in 1973 and led State to a 9–3 season in the tough Southeastern Conference and a victory in the 1974 Sun Bowl over North Carolina. During that season, his team beat perennial powerhouses in Georgia, and LSU.  The Bulldogs' record was 6–4–1 in 1975, and it was an impressive 9–2 in 1976, ending the season ranked #20 in the AP Poll.  His team compiled a 5–6 record in 1977, and he went 6–5 in his final season with the Bulldogs.

Mississippi State was placed on probation by the NCAA prior to the 1975 season due to alleged improper benefits to student athletes.  The school sought and won court approval to play in an adverse legal opinion to the NCAA.  Regardless and after the fact, the NCAA forced the school to forfeit four wins and one tie 1975, as well as the entire 1976 and 1977 seasons.

In 1981, Tyler coached at North Texas State University (now University of North Texas), where he went 2–9 in his only season there. Tyler then went on to coach at Northwest Mississippi Community College and Oxford High School in the 1980s. He was named Director of Mississippi State Parks, Wildlife and Fisheries and served in that capacity from 1992 to 1996. He also served as head coach of Millsaps Majors from 2000 until his retirement in 2002. His later-life hobbies include attending antique fairs regionally with his wife, Dale.

Tyler is recipient of numerous Coach of the Year awards on the high school and college levels. He also served as assistant and head coach of the Mississippi High School All-Star football games in 1966 and 1967.

Head coaching record

College

+   The 1975 team finished with a record of 6–4–1 (1-4-1 SEC) before NCAA probation
++  The 1976 team finished with a record of 9-2 (4-2 SEC) before NCAA probation
+++ The 1977 team finished with a record of 5-6 (2-4 SEC) before NCAA probation
^   Adjusted from 39-25-3 (14-22-1 SEC) by the NCAA

References

1932 births
Living people
Alabama Crimson Tide football coaches
Millsaps Majors football coaches
Mississippi State Bulldogs athletic directors
Mississippi State Bulldogs football coaches
North Texas Mean Green athletic directors
North Texas Mean Green football coaches
Ole Miss Rebels football coaches
High school football coaches in Mississippi
Junior college football coaches in the United States
NCAA sanctions
People from Water Valley, Mississippi